Watanabea is a genus of green algae in the family Trebouxiaceae.

References

External links

Trebouxiales
Trebouxiophyceae genera
Trebouxiophyceae